Spilberg is a surname. Notable people with the surname include:

Adriana Spilberg (1652–1700), Dutch Golden Age painter
Johannes Spilberg (1619–1690), German Baroque painter

See also
Spielberg (surname)